Bi Bi Seyyedan (also Romanized as Bī Bī Seyyedān) is a village in Padena-ye Sofla Rural District, Padena District, Semirom County, Isfahan Province, Iran. At the 2006 census, its population was 111, in 27 families.

References 

Populated places in Semirom County